Faculty of Medicine of The Chinese University of Hong Kong (CUHK) was established in 1981 and consists of five schools which offer an array of undergraduate and postgraduate programmes in the field of medicine, nursing, pharmacy and public health. The Hong Kong's Prince of Wales Hospital is the faculty's teaching facility and base of research. The medium of instruction of all programs is English while Chinese is also retained for the teaching of Chinese Medicine.

It is one of the only two medical training faculties established in Hong Kong, along with the older Li Ka Shing Faculty of Medicine, The University of Hong Kong. They are also the only two tertiary institutions in Hong Kong that provide medical and pharmacy programmes. CUHK's medical school has been ranked as one of the top 50 medical schools in the world, despite its short history of 35 years as of 2016.

History
The medical school of CUHK was approved to be established in 1974 by the Hong Kong legislative council and finished its basic construction to receive its first batch of medical undergraduates in 1981. The United Christian Hospital and the Kowloon Hospital were the teaching hospitals of the school prior to the opening of the Prince of Wales Hospital in 1984.

Later on, various schools and departments were opened as well, followed by the introduction of different programmes in other fields of healthcare and biomedical sciences other than the original medical one. With the establishment of the Department of Nursing, the Bachelor of Nursing (post-registration) and Bachelor of Nursing (pre-registration) degrees were introduced in 1991 and 1995 respectively at CUHK and the Department was then renamed as "The Nethersole School of Nursing" in 2002. Moreover, the Bachelor of Pharmacy programme was launched in 1992, being Hong Kong's first educational course in that domain. This is followed by the construction of the School of Public Health 7 years later which then has been providing the city's first and sole Bachelor of Science in Public Health programme starting from 2009. The School of Chinese Medicine which originally affiliates with the University's Faculty of Science transferred to the Medical Faculty from 1 July 2013 in consideration of the School's reconfiguration and development. During the time, various important medical related discoveries were also explored by the institute.

The first full-time Dean of Faculty of Medicine, Professor G. H. Choa, was appointed in 1977.  Currently, the Dean of Medicine is Professor Chan, Ka Leung Francis.

Programmes and admission

Currently, the majority of the seats are offered for students who are selected based on their strength in the local university entrance examination (HKDSE or previously HKALE) — the JUPAS students. Remaining ones are provided for non-JUPAS students, students who take overseas examinations such as GCE, or postgraduate students who have already completed a bachelor's degree. For example, the MBChB (medicine) programme offers 265 places annually, of which close to half of the places are allotted to non-JUPAS students. The duration of all programmes under the new HKDSE curriculum is at least 4 years, one more than that for former students who received HKALE qualifications. Non-JUPAS students will be assessed by the schools to decide their stream.

It is one of the only two tertiary institutions in Hong Kong which provide medical and pharmacy programmes and is the sole one that has a public health undergraduate programme. The competition is therefore fierce due to the limited numbers of intakes and a good examination performance is required, especially for medicine (MBChB) and pharmacy. Moreover, interviews are part of the selection process.

Following the UK model, medical students graduating from CUHK will be awarded the MBChB, which is the equivalent of the MBBS awarded by HKU. Other graduates will also be conferred with the corresponding Bachelor's degrees.

Moreover, the Faculty also provides different postgraduate programmes, including postgraduate diploma, Master's degrees and Doctoral degrees.

Schools and departments

Schools
CUHK Medical Faculty now consists of five schools: School of Biomedical Sciences; The Nethersole School of Nursing; School of Pharmacy, The Jockey Club School of Public Health and Primary Care, and The School of Chinese Medicine.

The School of Chinese Medicine, which originally affiliates with the University's Faculty of Science, transferred to the Medical Faculty from 1 July 2013.
School of Biomedical Sciences
The Nethersole School of Nursing
School of Pharmacy
The Jockey Club School of Public Health and Primary Care
School of Chinese Medicine

Departments
Departments at the faculty include:

 Anaesthesia and Intensive Care
 Anatomical and Cellular Pathology
 Anatomy
 Biochemistry (Medicine)
 Chemical Pathology
 Clinical Oncology
 Community and Family Medicine
 Diagnostic Radiology and Organ Imaging
 Medicine and Therapeutics
 Microbiology
 Obstetrics and Gynaecology
 Ophthalmology and Visual Sciences
 Orthopaedics and Traumatology
 Paediatrics
 Pharmacology
 Pharmacy
 Physiology
 Psychiatry
 Public Health
 Surgery
 Accident and Emergency Medicine Academic Unit

Affiliated hospitals
 Prince of Wales Hospital
 Kowloon Hospital
 United Christian Hospital
CUHK Medical Centre

See also
The Chinese University of Hong Kong
Li Ka Shing Faculty of Medicine, University of Hong Kong
Medical education in Hong Kong
 Collaborating Centre for Oxford University and CUHK for Disaster and Medical Humanitarian Response

References

Medical schools in Hong Kong
Chinese University of Hong Kong
1981 establishments in Hong Kong
Educational institutions established in 1981